Ohmdenosaurus ("Ohmden lizard") is a genus of sauropod dinosaur that lived during the Early Jurassic epoch in what is now Germany. The only specimen – a tibia (shinbone) and ankle – was discovered in rocks of the Posidonia Shale near Ohmden. The fossil was originally identified as a plesiosaur. Exhibited in a local museum, the Urweltmuseum Hauff, it caught the attention of German paleontologist Rupert Wild, who recognized it as the remains of a sauropod. Wild named Ohmdenosaurus in a 1978 publication, the only species is Ohmdenosaurus liasicus.

One of the earliest known sauropods, it was quadrupedal (four-legged) and already had the columnar limbs typical for the group. Its relationships to other sauropods remain poorly known due to the incompleteness of its remains, though it might have been close to the Australian genus Rhoetosaurus. The Posidonia Shale was deposited within a shallow inland sea and contained abundant and well-preserved fossils of marine reptiles including ichthyosaurs and plesiosaurs. Ohmdenosaurus was a terrestrial animal, and its carcass must have been transported by predators or water currents by at least  from the shoreline to its site of burial. It is the only dinosaur fossil known from the shale.

History of discovery
The Posidonia Shale at Holzmaden in southwestern Germany is one of the world's major fossil Lagerstätten (fossil deposit of exceptional importance). Deposited within an inland sea, it contains abundant marine reptiles such as ichthyosaurs, plesiosaurs, and crocodyliforms, sometimes with soft tissue preservation. This organic-rich shale has been quarried for more than 400 years, first for roofing and paving, and later also to extract oil. Its exceptionally preserved fossils were made famous by Bernhard Hauff, who started to collect and prepare specimens found in a quarry owned by his father. In 1862, Hauff presented an ichthyosaur specimen that still preserves the original body outline, revealing that ichthyosaurs possessed dorsal fins. Together with his son, he opened a local museum in Holzmaden in 1936/37, the Urweltmuseum Hauff, to display the finds.

In the 1970s, German paleontologist Rupert Wild, while visiting the Urweltmuseum Hauff, noticed a fossil in a display labelled as an upper arm bone of a plesiosaur. Wild recognized the specimen as a misidentified dinosaur fossil, borrowed the specimen for study and conducted additional preparation. The fossil, which lacks a specimen number, consists of a right tibia (shinbone) together with the astragalus and the calcaneus (the upper bones of the ankle). It had long been part of the museum's collection, and was collected from one of the early quarries near the village of Ohmden that were later refilled; the exact discovery site is unknown. In a 1978 publication, Wild determined the dinosaur fossil belonged to a new genus and species, which he named Ohmdenosaurus liasicus. The generic name Ohmdenosaurus is derived from that of the village of Ohmden and from the Ancient Greek σαῦρος (sauros), meaning lizard or reptile. The specific name liasicus refers to the Lias, an old name for the Lower Jurassic of Europe.

A chunk of rock – a gray-black, finely laminated slate containing small remains of fish – is still attached to the lower end of the fossil. This rock indicates that the fossil stems from the Unterer Schiefer ("lower slate"), the oldest part of the Posidonia Shale. It is therefore middle Toarcian in age (182.0 to 175.6 million years ago). This makes it one of the earliest sauropods known at the time. It also was, besides an undescribed femur (upper thigh bone) from Whitby, the only fossil of a terrestrial saurian known from the Toarcian. Between tibia and astragalus, the specimen also preserves a limestone geode that is rich in the mineral pyrite and contains fossils of the snail Coelodiscus.

Description
As all sauropods, Ohmdenosaurus was quadrupedal (four-legged) herbivore with a long neck and tail.

The upper end of the tibia is oval in shape when viewed from above, with a width-to-length ratio of 1.4. The lower end of the tibia is rotated by 90° relative to the upper end. The lower end of the tibia was formed by two rounded, well-separated prominences, the medial (inner) and lateral (outer) condyles. The medial condyle was much larger than the (broken) lateral condyle and located ca.  lower than the latter.

This surface has two concavities, a larger medial and a smaller lateral one; the latter was located about  higher than the former. These concavities received the medial and lateral condyles of the tibia, respectively. A furrow between these concavities is thought to be an attachment site for ligaments of the ankle. A circular element, its probable lower surface is convex, and its probable upper surface roughly textured, indicating the presence of a cartilage covering. Below the lateral condyle of the tibia, Wild noted several additional, small elements  in size, which he identified as cartilage given their grainy and irregular surfaces. In contrast to bone, cartilage is seldom preserved in fossils, and in this case might have been preserved thanks to the impregnation of calcium salts. As these elements are located close to the attachment site of the Achilles tendon, the area of the ankle that experienced the highest stresses in the living animal, Wild argued that they may represent sesamoids (small structures embedded within tendons). Alternatively, they could be calcified pieces of the cartilage of the astragalus.

Classification 
Saurischian ("reptile hipped") dinosaurs are subdivided into two major groups – the herbivorous sauropodomorphs and the mostly carnivorous theropods. Sauropodomorpha consists of the quadrupedal sauropods, which were characterized by straight, columnar limbs, as well as of a number of early and basal (early-diverging) forms that were mostly bipedal and had the limb bones angled against each other. Wild, in his 1978 description, argued that the Early Jurassic Ohmdenosaurus must have been a sauropod because its limb was clearly columnar: The tibia is more massive than seen in basal sauropodomorphs, and its upper joint surface is perpendicular to the long axis of the bone, demonstrating that the limb was straight when held in neutral posture. Furthermore, the astragalus lacks the ascending process (upwards directed bony projection) that is typical for the bipedal forms, but strongly reduced or absent in sauropods due to differences in weight distribution as a consequence of their columnar limbs. On the other hand, Wild noted a number of primitive features that are typical for basal sauropodomorphs but absent from other sauropods, including the sandal-shape of the astragalus and the stepped configuration of the lower articular surface of the tibia. The oval shape of the upper end of the tibia was intermediary between the circular shape seen in the basal sauropodomorph Plateosaurus and the strongly elliptical shape seen in later sauropods such as Cetiosaurus. Wild concluded that Ohmdenosaurus shows a mosaic of primitive and derived features and probably needs to be placed within a new family of sauropods.

A number of other basal sauropods have been described since, but relationships to these forms remain vague given the incompleteness of the Ohmdenosaurus specimen. In 1990, John Stanton McIntosh tentatively included Ohmdenosaurus in the Vulcanodontidae, noting that the tibia is very similar to that of the name-giving genus of the family, Vulcanodon. Later, however, the Vulcanodontidae has been demonstrated to be polyphyletic (does not form a natural group) and therefore fell out of use. Jay Nair and colleagues, in 2012, compared Ohmdenosaurus to the Australian genus Rhoetosaurus, noting that the tibiae of both genera are relatively slender as seen in later sauropods, unlike the more robust tibiae of other early genera. As Rhoetosaurus is geologically younger than Ohmdenosaurus, the latter would have been the earliest known sauropod with a slender tibia. The astragalus of Rhoetosaurus was found to be more similar to Ohmdenosaurus than to other sauropods. Sebastian Stumpf and colleagues, in 2015, reported fragmentary sauropod remains from the Toarcian of Grimmen in northeastern Germany, including four elements of the pelvic girdle and part of a vertebra. Although roughly contemporaneous with Ohmdenosaurus, they cannot be directly compared to the latter because they do not include elements of the hind limb. The Grimmen remains do, however, resemble those of the early sauropod Tazoudasaurus from Morocco, while Ohmdenosaurus appears to be closer to Rhoetosaurus. Stumpf and colleagues therefore suggested that Ohmdenosaurus and the Grimmen sauropod were not closely related to each other.

Taphonomy 

Wild, in his 1978 description, attempted to reconstruct the taphonomy of the specimen – the events between the death and final deposition of the individual. Such reconstructions are important for the understanding of the formation of the Posidonia Shale as a unique fossil deposit. These excavations are located on the sidewards projecting upper and lower ends, but only on the medial (inner) side of the bone. This indicates that the bone must have laid on its lateral (outer) side and partly covered by sediment, only exposing the most protruding parts of the other side to the elements. Because similar weathering traces are unseen in other fossils from the Posidonia shale due to the absence of currents near the sea floor, the weathering likely took place while the specimen was still on land or near the shore, perhaps in a river delta.

Based on this evidence, Wild concluded that the specimen must have been transported and deposited twice: Once from its place of death to the first site of deposition near the coast, where the weathering took place, and then to its final site of deposition far off the coast. The final transport could have happened through strong currents near the surface. Wild, however, considered it more likely that scavengers such as crocodiles or plesiosaurs brought the specimen to its final site because of the massiveness of the tibia and the considerable distance to the coast. It was probably only during this second transport that the carcass got separated: the tibia and ankle were found in articulation, indicating that soft tissue was still in place that held these bones together when the specimen arrived at its final site. The snail Coelodiscus that was found with the specimen could have been a scavenger feeding on the decaying soft tissue.

Paleoenvironment 
Ohmdenosaurus is the only known dinosaur fossil from this formation. Several flying animals are known, including the pterosaurs Dorygnathus and Campylognathoides; one layer contains abundant remains of dragonflies and net-winged insects. While driftwood is frequently found, other plant remains are rare and include horsetails, conifers, and the now extinct bennettitales. Since these remains are fragmented and sorted by water action, they provide limited information on the floral composition of their place of origin.

References 

Sauropods
Early Jurassic dinosaurs of Europe
Jurassic Germany
Fossils of Germany
Posidonia Shale
Fossil taxa described in 1978